The 3° Rally d'Italia Sardegna, the seventh round of the 2006 World Rally Championship season, took place between May 19 and May 21, 2006.

Results

Special Stages
All dates and times are CEST (UTC+2).

External links
 Results at eWRC.com
 Results at Jonkka's World Rally Archive

Sardegna
Rally Sardegna
Rally Italia Sardegna